The Ferrovie dello Stato Italiane (FS; Italian State Railways) Class 470 (Italian: Gruppo 470) is a 0-10-0 steam locomotive.

Design and construction
The Class 470 locomotive was one of twelve standard designs developed by the FS right after their institution, and was intended for heavy mountain work. The boiler was common with that of the FS Class 680, as was the four-cylinder compound Plancher engine, in which the two high pressure (HP) and the two low pressure (LP) cylinders were respectively grouped together, with each pair being served by a single piston valve via a crossed port arrangement.

The Class 470 was unusual in its appearance because the coal reserves were carried on board it, on the left side of the fully enclosed cab, while the water was carried by a separate tender; this has led some to define them as "semi-tank locomotives".

The Class 470 was built between 1907 and 1911 by Maffei (64 locomotives, 1907–09), Officine Meccaniche (52, 1908–11), Ernesto Breda (10, 1909) and Officine Meccaniche e Navali di Napoli (17, 1909–12), for a total of 143 locomotives.

P. M. Kalla-Bishop suggested that the Midland Railway 0-10-0 "Lickey Banker", which shared with the Class 470 the wheelbase and the crossed port arrangement, may have been inspired by it, as a complete sets of drawings of the Italian locomotive were stored at Derby.

Modifications

Classes 471 and 472
From 1918 until the 1930s, all but 14 of the Class 470 were rebuilt with a superheater and reclassified as the Class 471 (while keeping their old running numbers, e.g. the 470.018 became 471.018). From 1924 some of the rebuilt locomotives (24 in total) were also given enlarged HP cylinders of  diameter, and were initially reclassified as Class 472; from 1930, however, these were renumbered in the Class 471 as the subclass 471.2XX. In total, 105 Class 471 and 24 Class 472 locomotives were rebuilt.

Operation
Nicknamed "crematorium" by their crews (because of the fully enclosed cab, which made the work environment very hot and uncomfortable for the crews), the Class 470 and 471 locomotives served on steep mountain railways throughout Italy for all of their career, with some being assigned to passenger and freight work on important railways such as the Turin-Genoa railway, the Porrettana railway, the Turin-Modane railway and others. 

This meant that major summit lines would be among the first targets for further electrifications, and the Class 470 were gradually relegated to secondary lines.

The few unrebuilt Class 470 survived until the early 1960s. The last Class 471 locomotives were withdrawn in the early 1970s from service on the Sulmona-Terni railway.

Preservation
One Class 470 locomotive survived into preservation, the 470.092, currently preserved as a static exhibit in the Museo Nazionale della Scienza e della Tecnologia "Leonardo da Vinci" of Milan.

References

Bibliography
 
 

 

470
0-10-0 locomotives
Compound locomotives
Maffei locomotives
Breda locomotives
Railway locomotives introduced in 1907
Standard gauge locomotives of Italy
E n4v locomotives
Freight locomotives